Plaza Ambarrukmo (also Ambarrukmo Plaza, Amplaz) is a shopping mall in Sleman, Special Region of Yogyakarta with a building area of . Located in Jalan Laksda Adisucipto Yogyakarta and established in 2006, Plaza Ambarrukmo consists of 7 (seven) floors divided into a shopping area with more than 230 tenants and a parking area that can accommodate 1,000 cars and 1,400 motorcycles. Plaza Ambarrukmo is built with a blend of classical Javanese architectural concepts and modern interior design. Plaza Ambarrukmo has several exhibition venues on the Lower Ground floor, Ground Floor, 2nd Floor, and 3rd Floor. Plaza Ambarrukmo is also supported by 24 hour security system and CCTV located inside and outside the building.

See also 
 List of shopping malls in Indonesia

External links 
 Official Website

Shopping malls in Indonesia
Buildings and structures in the Special Region of Yogyakarta
Tourist attractions in Yogyakarta